is a Japanese professional baseball outfielder for the Chunichi Dragons in Japan's Nippon Professional Baseball.

External links

NPB.com

1993 births
Living people
Baseball people from Gunma Prefecture
Japanese baseball players
Nippon Professional Baseball outfielders
Orix Buffaloes players
Chunichi Dragons players
People from Shibukawa, Gunma